This is the list of the 22 currencies presently in circulation in the Arab World. The Kuwaiti dinar, the official currency of Kuwait, is the most valued currency in the world.

Arab Currencies

References 

Currencies by country
Currency lists